Iliesa Ratuva Tavuyara (27 June 1990) is an Fijan born Italian rugby union player.
His usual position is as a Wing and he currently plays for Rovigo Delta in Top10. 

From 2017 to 2018, he played with Waikato in NPC and in 2017–18 season he moved to France to play with Espoirs squad of Bordeaux-Bègles.
He played with Benetton in Pro14 and URC from 2018 to 2022.

On 8 November 2021 he was named in the Italy A squad for the 2021 end-of-year rugby union internationals. On 15 November 2021, Iliesa Ratuva Tavuyara was called up from the Italy A by Kieran Crowley to be part of an Italy 35-man squad for the 2021 end-of-year rugby union internationals. He made his debut against Uruguay.

References

External links
It's Rugby England Profile 

Fijian expatriate rugby union players
1990 births
Living people
Fijian rugby union players
Rugby union wings
King Country rugby union players
Waikato rugby union players
Union Bordeaux Bègles players
Benetton Rugby players
Italian rugby union players
Italy international rugby union players
Fijian expatriate sportspeople in New Zealand
Fijian expatriate sportspeople in France
Rugby Rovigo Delta players